Khumoyunmirzo Iminov (Uzbek Cyrillic: Хумоюнмирзо Иминов; born 15 January 2000) is an Uzbekistani footballer who currently plays as a midfielder for Pakhtakor Tashkent.

Honours
Pakhtakor Tashkent
 Uzbekistan Super League (1): 2019
 Uzbekistan Cup (1):  2019
 Uzbekistan League Cup (1):  2019

References

External links
 
 

2000 births
Living people
Uzbekistani footballers
Association football midfielders
Uzbekistan youth international footballers
Uzbekistani expatriate footballers
Expatriate footballers in Belarus
Pakhtakor Tashkent FK players
FC Energetik-BGU Minsk players
PFK Nurafshon players
Uzbekistan Super League players